Vladimir Cupara (born 19 February 1994) is a Serbian handball player for Telekom Veszprém and the Serbian national team.

He participated at the 2018 European Men's Handball Championship.

Individual awards
 SEHA League All-Star Team Best Goalkeeper: 2020-21

References

External links

1994 births
Living people
Handball players from Belgrade
Serbian male handball players
Expatriate handball players in Poland
Serbian expatriate sportspeople in Hungary
Serbian expatriate sportspeople in Poland
Serbian expatriate sportspeople in Spain
RK Crvena zvezda players
Liga ASOBAL players
CB Ademar León players
Veszprém KC players
Vive Kielce players